Randy William Cunneyworth (born May 10, 1961) is a Canadian former professional ice hockey player, former AHL head coach, NHL head coach and assistant coach, as well as a pro scout, and player development coach spanning nearly 40 years.

Cunneyworth recently served as a player development coach with the Buffalo Sabres organization. He played professionally in the National Hockey League (NHL) and American Hockey League (AHL) in a twenty-year career; his coaching résumé includes a brief stint as head coach of the NHL's Montreal Canadiens. He had long stints as both a player and coach of the AHL's Rochester Americans. Cunneyworth was born in Etobicoke, Ontario, but grew up in Mississauga, Ontario. As a player, Cunneyworth was known to be very physical, quick, and possessed the ability to provide reliable secondary scoring as well as handling defensive assignments.  A good powerplay performer, and was often called upon to play up on his team's top line. Often took on leadership roles, and was considered a genuine and selfless team player.

Playing career
As a youth, he played in the 1974 Quebec International Pee-Wee Hockey Tournament with a minor ice hockey team from Mississauga.

Mississauga Reps Midgets (1977-78)
Cunneyworth played one season of Midget hockey for the Mississauga Reps of the former Metro Toronto Hockey League GTHL

Dixie Beehives (1978–1979)
After being a 10th round selection (129th overall) in the 1978 OHL Midget Draft, Cunneyworth suited up for his first year of junior hockey with the Dixie Beehives of the former OPJHL OJHL.  As a 17-year old rookie, Cunneyworth scored 17 goals and 14 assists in 41 games.

Ottawa 67's (1979–1981)
After a strong showing with Dixie, Cunneyworth began his major junior hockey career with the Ottawa 67's of the Ontario Hockey League in the 1979–80 season, where in 63 games, he scored 16 goals and 41 points, helping the club into the playoffs.  In 11 playoff games, Cunneyworth recorded an assist. Following the season, Cunneyworth was chosen in the eighth round, 167th overall, by General Manager Scotty Bowman of the Buffalo Sabres in the 1980 NHL Entry Draft.

He returned to the Ottawa 67's for the 1980–81 season and led his team in scoring with 54 goals and 128 points in 67 games,  as well as leading with 240 penalty minutes.  In the playoffs, Cunneyworth appeared in 15 games, scoring five goals and 13 points.

Buffalo Sabres and Rochester Americans (1980–1985)
Cunneyworth appeared in one game with the AHL affiliate, the Rochester Americans in the 1980–81 season, where he earned an assist.  He also was called up to the Sabres from Ottawa on 3-1-81 by Sabres GM Scotty Bowman and played in his first NHL game vs the Boston Bruins in Boston 1980–81, where he was held off the scoresheet. Re-joined the Sabres for the post-season along with other prospects following the end of the OHA playoffs, but did not play in any games.

Suffered a serious eye injury (a Barry Melrose high stick) during a September 1981 preseason game at Toronto and missed the remainder of the preseason. Cunneyworth began the season with Buffalo. During the 1981–82 season, he appeared in 20 games, scoring two goals and six points.  Played primarily on the CPR (Canadian Pacific Railroad) line with young teammates Steve Patrick and Lindy Ruff. This nickname was given to the trio by then Sabres Assistant Coach Nick Polano. Earned his first NHL assist 10-7-81 against the Washington Capitals. Scored his first NHL goal against the Rangers at Madison Square Garden on 11-11-81 in New York against goalie Steve Weeks. Was reassigned to the Sabres affiliate in Rochester in late November.  He spent the rest of the 1981–82 season with the Rochester Americans, playing in 57 games, scoring 12 goals and 27 points. Spent the playoffs with Rochester, scoring four goals in nine games, as the Americans lost to the Binghamton Whalers in the South Division finals.

Cunneyworth spent the entire 1982–83 season with the Mike Keenan coached Rochester Americans.  Appeared in 78 games scoring 23 goals and 56 points. In 16 playoff games, Cunneyworth had four goals and eight points, helping the Americans win the 1983 Calder Cup Championship defeating the Maine Mariners.

Cunneyworth spent another full season in the American Hockey League in the 1983–84 season with Rochester, as he scored 18 goals and 35 points in 65 games, once again helping the Americans reach the playoffs.  In 17 post-season games, Cunneyworth scored five goals and 10 points, as Rochester lost to the Maine Mariners in the 1984 Calder Cup finals.

During the 1984-85 Buffalo Sabres pre-season, Cunneyworth scored 3 goals and had an assist in 4 exhibition games. He was also among the leading scorers in inter-squad scrimmages but failed to secure a roster spot. The 1984–85 season would be Cunneyworth's third full season with the Americans playing in 72 games for Rochester, scoring 30 goals and 68 points to finish third in team scoring.  In five playoff games, Cunneyworth had two goals and three points, as the Americans fell to the Baltimore Skipjacks in the first round of the playoffs.

Cunneyworth and teammate Ted Nolan began using local Rochester businessman Steve Bartlett as their representative/agent.

Although offered a contract, Cunneyworth elected not to re-sign with the Buffalo Sabres organization, although the team held his rights.  Cunneyworth was granted the permission by Sabres GM Scotty Bowman to attend the NHL's Pittsburgh Penguins training camp/preseason roster.  On October 4, 1985, following the pre-season tryout, Bowman traded Cunneyworth and Mike Moller to the Pittsburgh Penguins for Pat Hughes.

Pittsburgh Penguins (1985–1989)
Randy Cunneyworth returned to the NHL for the 1985–86 as a full-time player with the Pittsburgh Penguins.  In 75 games, Cunneyworth scored 15 goals and 45 points to finish sixth in team scoring, as Pittsburgh missed the playoffs by two points, finishing in fifth place in the Patrick Division.  Was classified as an NHL rookie.

In 1986–87, Cunneyworth improved his offensive numbers, scoring 26 goals and 53 points in 79 games to finish third in team scoring behind Mario Lemieux and Dan Quinn, however, the Penguins failed to qualify for the playoffs again, finishing in fifth place, four points out of the post-season.  Cunneyworth scored a hat trick in the season opener October 9, 1986 vs Washington, and had a four-goal game @ Quebec March 3, 1987. Recorded 11 multiple point games. Was the Penguins nominee for the Masterton Trophy.

The 1987–88 season would be the best offensive season of Cunneyworth's career, as he scored 35 goals and 74 points in 71 games, finishing an impressive third in scoring behind Lemieux and Quinn, however, the Penguins once again failed to qualify for the playoffs, finishing in last place in the Patrick Division despite a 36–35–9 record.

Although a consideration, Cunneyworth was not selected by Wales Conference Coach Mike Keenan for the NHL All-Star Game although his point totals ranked among the league leaders for his position at mid-season.

Cunneyworth missed 8 regular season games from Jan 16-30 due to an NHL suspension (5 games for a stick incident vs Boston on Dec 29, and 3 games for a match penalty during a fight with Steve Konroyd vs the NY Islanders on Jan 12.) Recorded 20 multiple point games.  Scored 14 power-play goals

In 1988, Cunneyworth joined Paul Coffey as one of the team's Assistant Captains. Played primarily on the team's second line, still managed 25 goals and 44 points in 70 games. Was shifted to right-wing late in the season in order to create a solid second line for the upcoming playoff run.  In 11 playoff games, Cunneyworth scored three goals and eight points, as Pittsburgh lost to the Philadelphia Flyers in seven games in the Patrick Division final. For the first time, Cunneyworth's name appeared on the NHL all-star ballot for left wingers.

Recorded a career game high 27 minutes in penalties in a game played February 11, 1989 @ Quebec where Cunneyworth was involved in two on ice fights (vs Marc Fortier and Darrin Kimble) during a line brawl.  Cunneyworth also left the penalty box during the altercation to aid teammate John Cullen. After throwing a punch at Nordiques rookie Joe Sakic, Cunneyworth engaged Kimble in a fight and was head-butted by Kimble. Missed part of the season when he was hit with a shot by Paul Coffey during a Penguins practice Jan 24, 1989.

On June 17, 1989, the Penguins traded Cunneyworth, Rick Tabaracci and Dave McLlwain to the Winnipeg Jets for Jim Kyte, Andrew McBain and Randy Gilhen.

Winnipeg Jets (1989)
Cunneyworth began the 1989–90 season with the Winnipeg Jets, where he played in 28 games for the Jets, scoring five goals and 11 points. Cunneyworth's name appeared on the NHL All-Star ballot for Left Wingers. Played primarily on a line with Jets Captain Dale Hawerchuk and Greg Paslawski.

On December 13, 1989, Winnipeg traded Cunneyworth to the Hartford Whalers for Paul MacDermid.

Hartford Whalers (1989–1994)
Cunneyworth finished the 1989–90 season with the Hartford Whalers, where in 43 games, he scored nine goals and 18 points, helping the Whalers qualify for the playoffs. In four playoff games, Cunneyworth was held pointless, as the Whalers lost to the Boston Bruins in the Adams Division semi-finals.

He suffered through an injury plagued 1990–91 season (broken leg/ankle injuries) after being hit by an Ulf Samuelsson shot during Hartford's December 21, 1990 game at Montreal. Appearing in only 32 games for the Whalers, scoring nine goals and 14 points, as the team reached the playoffs once again.  Cunneyworth played in only one playoff game, getting no points, as the Whalers were once again eliminated by the Boston Bruins in the first round.

In a preseason game, Cunneyworth recorded a third-period hat-trick. Injuries continued to take a toll during the 1991–92 season (ankle injury/back strains), as Cunneyworth played in 39 games with Hartford, scoring seven goals and 17 points, helping the Whalers reach the playoffs for the third consecutive season.  In seven playoff games, Cunneyworth had three goals (tied for team lead) as Hartford lost to the Montreal Canadiens in the first round of the post-season.

A healthier Cunneyworth playing under coach Paul Holmgren for 1992–93 saw spot duty and was often a healthy scratch.  In 39 games, he scored five goals and nine points. Hartford failed to reach the playoffs. Earned 27 minutes in penalties in a game against Pittsburgh on December 4, 1993, in which Cunneyworth instigated a line brawl that featured a fight between Cunneyworth and Markus Naslund.

In 1993–94, playing full-time under new coach Pierre McGuire, Cunneyworth appeared in 63 games with Hartford, scoring nine goals and 17 points.  On March 11, 1994, with the Whalers well out of the playoff hunt, Whalers GM Paul Holmgren traded Cunneyworth, Gary Suter and the Whalers third round pick in the 1995 NHL Entry Draft to the Chicago Blackhawks for Frantisek Kucera and Jocelyn Lemieux.

Chicago Blackhawks (1994)
Cunneyworth finished the 1993–94 season with the Chicago Blackhawks, where in 16 games, he scored four goals and seven points, as the Blackhawks made the playoffs as the sixth seed in the Western Conference.  Cunneyworth played in six playoff games with Chicago, getting no points, as the Blackhawks lost to the Toronto Maple Leafs in the first round of the post-season.  Played in the last NHL game ever played in Chicago Stadium.

After the season, Cunneyworth elected free agency. On July 15, 1994, he signed a contract with the Ottawa Senators.

Ottawa Senators (1994–1998)
Due to the 1994–95 NHL lockout, the 1994–95 season was shortened to 48 games.  Named the new Senators team captain prior to the start of the season, Cunneyworth appeared in every game during the season. He scored five goals and ten points. The team finished in last place in the NHL. Was the Senators nominee for the King Clancy Award (Leadership and Dedication to the Game)

Cunneyworth had a very solid 1995–96 NHL season with Ottawa, playing in 81 games, scoring 17 goals and 36 points, his highest totals since the 1988–89 season.  The Senators once again failed to reach the playoffs, finishing in last place in the league. Had a four-point game February 26, 1996 at St. Louis.

Cunneyworth had another solid season. In 1996–97, he played in 76 games for the Senators, scoring 12 goals and 36 points, as he helped the club qualify for the playoffs for the first time in team history, as Ottawa finished in seventh place in the Eastern Conference. He suffered a broken cheekbone during a February 28 game in a fight with Islanders Rich Pilon. In the post-season, Cunneyworth had a goal and two points in seven games, as the Senators lost to the Buffalo Sabres in the first round.

Cunneyworth saw his offensive numbers drop in the 1997–98 season, as he scored two goals and 13 points in 71 games, as Ottawa once again reached the playoffs.  In the post-season, Cunneyworth had an assist in six games, as the Senators lost to the Washington Capitals in the Eastern Conference semi-finals.

After four seasons with the Senators, Cunneyworth was given his release by newly hired GM Rick Dudley and became a free agent, and on August 27, 1998, he signed with the Buffalo Sabres.

Buffalo Sabres & Rochester Americans (1998–2000)
On August 27, 1998, Cunneyworth returned to his first NHL team, the Buffalo Sabres for the 1998–99 season signing as a free agent.  He appeared in 14 games with the Sabres, scoring two goals and four points including the game-winning goal at Vancouver on February 11, 1999.  Cunneyworth played in three playoff games for the Sabres, all in the 1999 Stanley Cup Finals, as Buffalo lost to the Dallas Stars.  He spent a majority of the season with the Rochester Americans of the AHL, as Cunneyworth suited up for 52 games with the Americans, scoring 10 goals and 28 points while serving as a Player/Assistant Coach. In 20 playoff games, Cunneyworth had three goals and 17 points, as Rochester lost to the Providence Bruins in the 1999 Calder Cup Finals. Played on the Americans top line with Dominic Pittis and Craig Fisher.

He returned to the Americans for the 1999–2000 season once again as a Player/Assistant Coach, as Cunneyworth played in 52 games with Rochester, scoring eight goals and 24 points. Cunneyworth was named captain of Team Canada for the 2000 Kodak AHL All-Star Classic. 
 
On February 18, 2000, Cunneyworth suffered a season ending knee injury in a game against the Quebec Citadelles.  He missed the rest of the season and playoffs, where the Americans lost to the Hartford Wolf Pack in the 2000 Calder Cup Finals.

Cunneyworth was the recipient of the AHL's Fred T. Hunt Memorial Award.  This award honors the player that best exemplifies the qualities of sportsmanship, determination, and dedication to hockey.

On September 8, 2000, Cunneyworth officially announced his retirement from playing hockey and was named the new head coach of the Rochester Americans by Sabres GM Darcy Regier.

Coaching career

Rochester Americans (1999–2008) First Stint
During both years as a player, Cunneyworth acted as a player-assistant coach with the Rochester Americans, the Buffalo Sabres AHL affiliate during the 1999–2000 AHL season serving under head coach Brian McCutcheon.  After the 1999–2000 season, Cunneyworth retired from being an active player and was named the head coach of the club by Sabres GM Darcy Regier.

In his first season as head coach with the team in 2000–01, Cunneyworth led the club to a 46–22–9–3 record, getting 104 points, and first place in the Mid-Atlantic Division.  In the playoffs, the Americans were upset by the Philadelphia Phantoms in four games in the first round.

In the 2001–02, the Americans slumped to a 32–30–15–3 record, earning 82 points and ninth in the Western Conference.  Cunneyworth was fined by the league for throwing a water bottle at referee Chris Rooney due to a disputed goal call vs Syracuse. The Americans qualified   for a best-of-three qualifying series with the eighth seeded Philadelphia Phantoms. The Americans were then swept in two games, missing the post-season.

The Americans had another mediocre season in 2002–03, as the team finished the season with a 31–30–14–5 record, getting 81 points, and tenth place in the Western Conference.  The Americans faced the seventh place Milwaukee Admirals for a best-of-three qualifying series, and Milwaukee won the series two games to one to eliminate the Americans from post-season play.

Rochester improved during the 2003–04 season, earning a record of 37–28–10–5, recording 89 points and third place in the North Division.  In the playoffs, the Americans defeated the Syracuse Crunch and Hamilton Bulldogs before losing to the Milwaukee Admirals in the Western Conference finals.

In 2004–05, Rochester won the Macgregor Kilpatrick Trophy, as the Americans had the best record in the AHL with a 51–19–6–4 record, earning 112 points.  The Americans swept the Hamilton Bulldogs in the first round of the playoffs, however, Rochester was upset by the Manitoba Moose in the second round to end their season. Cunneyworth was awarded with the Louis A.R. Pieri Memorial Award as the AHL's Coach of the Year.

In the 2005–06, the Americans became the AHL affiliate of both the Buffalo Sabres and Florida Panthers.  The team struggled, finishing under .500 for the first time since Cunneyworth became the head coach, as Rochester went 37–39–2–2 for 78 points, fifth in the North Division, missing the playoffs.

The Americans rebounded in the 2006–07 season, earning a record of 48–30–1–1, registering 98 points, and second place in the North Division.  In the playoffs, Rochester lost to the Hamilton Bulldogs in the first round.

In 2007–08, the Americans struggled, going only 24–46–6–4, earning 58 points, which was the worst record in the league.  On July 24, 2008, Cunneyworth left his position of head coach of the Americans to take an assistant coaching job with the Atlanta Thrashers.

Atlanta Thrashers (2008–2010)
Cunneyworth joined new Atlanta Thrashers head coach John Anderson as an assistant coach for the 2008–09 season.  In his first season with the Thrashers, the team finished with a 35–41–6 record, getting 76 points, well out of a playoff position.

In 2009–10, the Thrashers improved to a 35–34–13 record, earning 83 points, however, the club finished out of the playoffs once again.  On April 14, 2010, Atlanta's newly hired General Manager Rick Dudley fired Anderson and all of his assistant coaches, including Randy Cunneyworth. After the firing, Dudley was asked if Cunneyworth could possibly return to the team and responded, "I'm not going to commit to (looking at Cunneyworth). Randy was an assistant coach here and he's a guy I have a great deal of affection for. But, I'm not going to get into who is on the list,"

Hamilton Bulldogs (2010–2011)
On July 20, 2010, Pierre Gauthier, the GM of the Montreal Canadiens hired Cunneyworth to be the head coach of their AHL affiliate, the Hamilton Bulldogs.  In his first season with the club in 2010–11, Cunneyworth led the Bulldogs to an impressive 44–27–2–7 record, getting 97 points and first place in the North Division.  In the post-season, he led the club to series victories over the Oklahoma City Barons and Manitoba Moose before losing to the Houston Aeros in the Western Conference finals.

On July 22, 2011, the Canadiens added Cunneyworth to their NHL assistant coaching staff.

Montreal Canadiens (2011–2012)
Cunneyworth began the 2011–12 season as an assistant coach to head coach Jacques Martin on the Montreal Canadiens. On December 17, 2011, the Canadiens fired Martin and named Cunneyworth the interim head coach. Cunneyworth's promotion caused minor controversy because, at the time, he only spoke English. The last full-time Canadiens coach who did not speak French at all was Al MacNeil in 1971. As a result, several Quebec nationalist groups called for a boycott of Molson. In response, Canadiens owner Geoff Molson promised that Cunneyworth's permanent replacement would be bilingual. Quebec Culture Minister Christine St-Pierre said she expected the Canadiens to rectify the situation as soon as possible. Cunneyworth himself had promised to learn French during the season.

On January 7, 2012, during a game against the Tampa Bay Lightning, a protest was held outside of the Bell Centre. Cunneyworth's final game of the 2011–12 season rewarded his efforts with a 4 – 1 victory over the Toronto Maple Leafs. That game saw forward Tomáš Plekanec score a rare 3-on-5 shorthanded goal; a feat which had not been accomplished in 25 years by a fellow Hab. On May 2, 2012, Cunneyworth was returned to his former position as assistant coach by new Canadiens General Manager and former Cunneyworth teammate Marc Bergevin.  However, only a month later, on June 6, Cunneyworth was fired by new coach Michel Therrien.

Rochester Americans (2015–16)
On July 28, 2015 Buffalo Sabres General Manager Tim Murray promoted Randy Cunneyworth from the position of Buffalo Sabres Player Development Coach to the position of Head Coach of the Rochester Americans. This is Cunneyworth's second stint as head coach. On Feb 19, 2016 (2-1 OT win vs Portland), Cunneyworth passed John Van Boxmeer for first in Amerks history in all-time games coached with game 691.  On March 24, 2016, (6-5 OT win vs St. Johns) Cunneyworth became the Rochester Americans all-time winningest coach passing John Van Boxmeer with win number 338. The 2015-16 Americans failed to reach the postseason.

In a reorganization, Cunneyworth returned to his previous position in the Sabres' player development program as Dan Lambert was hired as head coach of the Americans on May 16, 2016.

Buffalo Sabres - Scout / Player Development (2013–2017)
On November 2, 2013, Sabres General Manager Darcy Regier hired Cunneyworth as professional scout for the Buffalo Sabres. His position would also include special assignments as prescribed by the Sabres front office. He was heavily rumored to be possible replacement for then struggling rookie Sabres Head Coach Ron Rolston.

On January 8, 2014, Randy Cunneyworth was promoted to Special Assistant and Player Development Coach/Administrator of the AHL's Rochester Americans by the newly hired Sabres President of Hockey Operations Pat Lafontaine. Cunneyworth would also work directly with Sabres interim Head Coach Ted Nolan in ensure continuity between the Sabres and their AHL affiliate in Rochester. This would include coaching systems and strategies.
According to Pat Lafontaine, "This is an exciting opportunity to fully utilize all of Randy’s expertise as a hockey coach and mentor, Randy will work to ensure that the link between the Sabres and Amerks grows even stronger.

Summer 2014: Cunneyworth was a candidate for the position of Head Coach with the Ottawa 67's.

On August 21, 2014, Cunneyworth was promoted to the position of Buffalo Sabres Player Development Coach by new General Manager Tim Murray. This is an organizational position. Cunneyworth is to oversee player development in Buffalo, with the AHL Rochester Americans, as well as other Sabres prospects.

Summer 2015:  Considered a candidate for either the vacant NHL Head Coaching positions with the Buffalo Sabres,(which went to Dan Bylsma) or the AHL Rochester Americans.

July 28, 2015 Cunneyworth was promoted to the position of Head Coach of the AHL Rochester Americans and formally introduced to the media on July 29, 2015.

Spring 2016: Cunneyworth returned to the Sabres coaching staff within the Department of Player Development.

June 27, 2017: Cunneyworth was fired along with other long term staff members by Sabres newly hired General Manager Jason Botterill.

Miscellaneous

Cunneyworth had spent 19 out of his 36 years in professional hockey with the Buffalo Sabres organization.

Cunneyworth currently holds 5th place in American Hockey League (AHL) all-time games coached with 796, and holds 6th place in all-time wins with 384.

Played 1,231 professional games at the NHL and AHL levels (regular and post-season games)

In 2010, Randy Cunneyworth was inducted into the Rochester Americans Hall of Fame. Cunneyworth received his plaque and was inducted by Amerks Owner and CEO Curt Styres, VP of Hockey Operations Ted Nolan, and Amerks Hall of Famer and Director of Hockey Operations Jody Gage.

Cunneyworth was inducted into Rochester New York's Sports Walk of Fame at Frontier Park in 2013.

Career statistics

NHL coaching record

References

External links

1961 births
Living people
Atlanta Thrashers coaches
Buffalo Sabres coaches
Buffalo Sabres draft picks
Buffalo Sabres players
Buffalo Sabres scouts
Canadian ice hockey left wingers
Chicago Blackhawks players
Hartford Whalers players
Montreal Canadiens coaches
Ottawa 67's players
Ottawa Senators players
Pittsburgh Penguins players
Rochester Americans coaches
Rochester Americans players
Sportspeople from Etobicoke
Ice hockey people from Toronto
Sportspeople from Mississauga
Springfield Indians players
Winnipeg Jets (1979–1996) players
Canadian ice hockey coaches